Mina canta o Brasil is an album by Italian singer Mina, released in 1970. It was recorded entirely in Portuguese. It was re-issued on CD by EMI in 2001.

Seven songs of this album had been previously recorded by Mina in Italian language: "Canto de ossanha" (with the title "Chi dice non dà", in Mina alla Bussola dal vivo); "Upa neguinho" ("Allegria", in Mina alla Bussola dal vivo); "Que maravilha" ("Che meraviglia", in the following Quando tu mi spiavi in cima a un batticuore); "A banda" ("La banda", in Sabato sera – Studio Uno '67); "Tem mais samba" ("C'è più samba", in Mina alla Bussola dal vivo); "A praça" ("Dai dai domani", B side of the 45rpm record "Non credere"); "Nem vem que não tem" ("Sacumdì sacumdà", in Canzonissima '68).

Track listing

Side A

Side B

1970 albums
Mina (Italian singer) albums
Portuguese-language albums